Portland, Oregon has a large LGBT community for its size. Notable LGBT people from the city include:

 Sam Adams – first openly gay mayor of a large U.S. city
 Matt Alber – singer-songwriter
 Terry Bean – gay rights activist and political fundraiser
 James Beard – chef and cookbook author
 Byron Beck
 Brett Bigham – educator
 Jody Bleyle – musician
 Bolivia Carmichaels – drag performer
 Kate Brown – 38th Governor of Oregon
 Carrie Brownstein – actress, musician
 Darcelle XV – drag queen
Darren G. Davis – comic book publisher and writer
 Beth Ditto – singer-songwriter and actress
 Sarah Dougher – musician
 Donna Dresch – musician
 Marie Equi – medical doctor, family planning advocate
 Flawless Shade – drag queen and make-up artist
 Gregory Gourdet – chef
 Laci Green – YouTuber
 Lou Harrison – composer
 Alan L. Hart – one of the first trans men to undergo hysterectomy and gonadectomy in the U.S.
 Todd Haynes – film director
 Jinkx Monsoon – drag queen
 Rupert Kinnard – cartoonist
 Rives Kistler – first and, then, only openly LGBT state supreme court justice in the U.S.
 Tina Kotek – openly gay member of the Oregon Legislative Assembly
 Storm Large – singer
 Thomas Lauderdale – musician
 Michael J. McShane – United States District Judge of the United States District Court for the District of Oregon
 Jonte' Moaning – choreographer and dancer
 Lynn Nakamoto – Oregon Supreme Court judge
 Andy Ngo – journalist
 Chuck Palahniuk – author
 John Paulk – former gay reparative therapy advocate
 Poison Waters – drag performer
 Johnnie Ray – singer, songwriter, musician
 Aria Sa'id
 Dale Scott
 Ari Shapiro – journalist
 Gail Shibley – first openly gay person to serve in the Oregon State Legislature
 Tammy Stoner – writer, artist
 Gus Van Sant – filmmaker
 Corin Tucker – musician
 Holcombe Waller
 Minor White – photographer
 Cameron Whitten – activist
 Kaia Wilson – musician
 Martin Wong – artist
 Lidia Yuknavitch – writer
 Peter Zuckerman – journalist

References

LGBT people from Oregon
LGBT
Portland, Oregon-related lists
Lists of American LGBT people